Ammotrechinus is a monotypic genus of ammotrechid camel spiders, first described by Carl Friedrich Roewer in 1934. Its single species, Ammotrechinus gryllipes is distributed in Haiti and Jamaica.

References 

Solifugae
Arachnid genera
Monotypic arachnid genera